The Tennessee cave salamander (Gyrinophilus palleucus) is a species of salamander in the family Plethodontidae, endemic to the Appalachian Mountains in the United States. Its natural habitats are streams in caves. It is threatened by habitat loss.

Distribution
The Tennessee cave salamander inhabits the southern Cumberland Plateau in the Appalachian Mountains in the United States. Its range includes south-central Tennessee, western North Carolina, northeastern Alabama, northwestern Alabama and northwestern Georgia. The salamander lives in cave systems, and is probably present in some systems as yet unexplored.

Ecology
The salamander's diet consists of amphipods and other small aquatic invertebrates that live in caves. It occurs on sand, gravel, mud or rock, in streams, in rimstone pools and in isolated pools. It prefers clear water without sediment. It is occasionally seen outside caves but it is thought that this occurs when it has been accidentally washed out by floodwater.

This species is usually paedomorphic. This means it remains in the larval state for all of its life. Paedomorphic individuals breed as larvae, but some individuals continue to develop and undergo metamorphosis in the usual way.

Status
G. palleucus lives in caves and is dependent on the quality of the water in the streams that flow through them. Threats it faces include pollution, siltation, flooding, increased water flow and the filling of sinkholes and dumping of trash. This salamander is known from about two dozen sites but probably occurs in other cave systems. For these reasons, the International Union for Conservation of Nature has rated its conservation status as "threatened" and advocates protection of the watersheds that drain into the caverns in which it lives.

References

Citations

Further reading
Besharse, J.C. and R.A. Brandon. 1973. "Optomotor response and eye structure in the troglobitic salamander Gyrinophilus palleucus". Amer. Mid. Natur. 89: 463-467.

External links
NewScientist.com: Salamanders formed new species despite interbreeding
Distribution and relative abundance of Tennessee cave salamanders (Gyrinophilus palleucus and Gyrinophilus gulolineatus) with an emphasis on Tennessee populations

Cave salamanders
Gyrinophilus
Endemic fauna of the United States
Amphibians of the United States
Taxonomy articles created by Polbot
Amphibians described in 1954